Beauvais Lake Provincial Park is a provincial park located west of Pincher Creek, Alberta, Canada. The park is popular with tourists for its mountain scenery and its rainbow trout fishing.

See also
List of Alberta provincial parks
List of Canadian provincial parks
List of National Parks of Canada

External links
Park page at AB parks

Provincial parks of Alberta
Municipal District of Pincher Creek No. 9